Bruno Cunha (born ) is a Portuguese male volleyball player. He is part of the Portugal men's national volleyball team. On club level he plays for VC Viana.

References

External links
 profile at FIVB.org

1997 births
Living people
Portuguese men's volleyball players
Place of birth missing (living people)